Margaret Murphy (born 21 September 1944) is an Irish hurdler. She competed in the women's 100 metres hurdles at the 1972 Summer Olympics.

References

1944 births
Living people
Athletes (track and field) at the 1972 Summer Olympics
Irish female hurdlers
Irish pentathletes
Olympic athletes of Ireland
Place of birth missing (living people)